Doris Gregory is a Canadian author. She is noted for her role ending gender-based segregation in Canadian universities.

Gregory studied English at the University of British Columbia in the early 1940s. At the time, many courses were segregated by gender, with separate courses with female lecturers for female students. Gregory organized a group of women to "crash" one of the men's lectures.  After being asked to leave the class, Gregory wrote a story about the incident for the student paper, the Ubyssey. The story was republished by the Canadian University Press, and the women were allowed to join the men's lecture.

Gregory dropped out of university to join the Canadian Women's Army Corps in 1942, and was stationed in London and Farmborough. An autobiography about her experiences, titled How I Won the War For the Allies: One Sassy Canadian Soldier's Story, was published by Ronsdale Press in June 2014.

References

Canadian autobiographers
Canadian women journalists
Canadian women non-fiction writers
Living people
Women autobiographers
Year of birth missing (living people)
21st-century Canadian women writers
21st-century Canadian non-fiction writers